Thomas Robinson Moffitt (February 26, 1884 – May 2, 1945) was an American track and field athlete who competed in the 1908 Summer Olympics. In 1908 he finished fifth in the high jump competition.

References

External links 
 Profile at Sports-Reference.com

1884 births
1945 deaths
American male high jumpers
Olympic track and field athletes of the United States
Athletes (track and field) at the 1908 Summer Olympics
Olympic male high jumpers